WRBN (96.3 FM, "Sky 96.3") is a radio station broadcasting an adult contemporary music format. Licensed to Clayton, Georgia, United States, the station is currently owned by Georgia-Carolina Radiocasting and the broadcast license is held by Sutton Radiocasting Corporation. WRBN features programming from Citadel Media. The call sign WRBN was assigned to a small radio station in Warner Robins, Georgia (101.7 FM) from 1965 to 1988.

History
The station was assigned the call letters WLFA on 1989-09-29.  On 1989-11-29, the station changed its call sign to WQXJ then again on 1996-12-09 to the current WRBN.

References

External links

RBN
Mainstream adult contemporary radio stations in the United States